Dante Stefani (19 September 1927 – 3 February 2023) was an Italian partisan and politician. A member of the Italian Communist Party, he served in the Senate of the Republic from 1979 to 1987.

Stefani died in Bologna on 3 February 2023, at the age of 95.

References

1927 births
2023 deaths
Italian designers
Senators of Legislature VIII of Italy
Senators of Legislature IX of Italy
Italian Communist Party politicians
Democratic Party of the Left politicians
Democrats of the Left politicians
Democratic Party (Italy) politicians
Politicians from Bologna